Jakob Bartsch or Jacobus Bartschius (c. 1600 – 26 December 1633) was a German astronomer.

Biography
Bartsch was born in Lauban (Lubań) in Lusatia. He was taught how to use the astrolabe by Sarcephalus (Christopher Hauptfleisch), a librarian in Breslau (Wrocław). He also studied astronomy and medicine at the University of Strassburg (Strasbourg).

In 1624 Bartsch published a book titled Usus astronomicus planisphaerii stellati containing star charts that depicted six new constellations introduced around 1613 by Petrus Plancius on a celestial globe published by Pieter van den Keere. These six new constellations were Camelopardalis, Gallus, Jordanis, Monoceros (which he called Unicornu), Tigris and Vespa. He also mentioned but did not depict Rhombus, a separate invention by Isaac Habrecht II. Bartsch was often wrongly credited with having invented these figures. Only Camelopardalis and Monoceros survive today.

Bartsch married Johannes Kepler's daughter Susanna on 12 March 1630 and helped Kepler with his calculations. After Kepler's death in 1630, Bartsch edited Kepler's posthumous work Somnium. He also helped gather money from Kepler's estate for his widow.

Bartsch died in Lauban in 1633.

Related quotes

Notes

External links
 Bartsch, Jacob. Usus Astronomicus Planisphaerii Stellati, 1624. (Scans by Felice Stoppa.) The first cartographic use of the term planisphere.

1600s births
1633 deaths
People from Lubań
17th-century German astronomers
Johannes Kepler